An election for all seven members of the Federal Council, the Government of Switzerland, was held on 9 December 2015, following the federal election on 19 October 2015, for the 2016–2020 term.

Eveline Widmer-Schlumpf, a member of the Conservative Democratic Party (BDP/PBD), announced she would not run for reelection after the Swiss People's Party (SVP/UDC) won a record 29.4% of the vote, whilst her own party received 4.1% of the vote. The SVP/UDC was widely expected to fill her seat in the election; it chose Thomas Aeschi (Zug), Guy Parmelin (Vaud) and Norman Gobbi (Ticino) as candidates for the seat, with Aeschi being the favourite at the time.

Guy Parmelin, of the SVP/UDC, was ultimately elected by the Federal Assembly on 9 December 2015. Parmelin, a farmer and winegrower from Bursins in the canton of Vaud, became the first Federal Councillor of the Swiss People's Party from the French-speaking part of Switzerland.

There was a minor cabinet reshuffle after the election, as newly-elected Federal Councillor Parmelin was selected to become head of the Federal Department of Defence, Civil Protection and Sports, replacing fellow SVP/UDC member Ueli Maurer, who became head of the Federal Department of Finance. The SVP/UDC regained its second seat on the Federal Council, which it had lost in 2008, when the newly-created BDP/PBD split from the SVP/UDC.

Incumbents
Incumbents, in descending order of seniority, including political party affiliation and department at the time of the election:
Doris Leuthard (CVP/PDC), from Aargau, head of the Federal Department of Environment, Transport, Energy and Communications,
Eveline Widmer-Schlumpf (BDP/PBD), from Grisons, head of the Federal Department of Finance (did not run for reelection),
Ueli Maurer (SVP/UDC), from Zürich, head of the Federal Department of Defence, Civil Protection and Sports,
Didier Burkhalter (FDP.The Liberals), from Neuchâtel, head of the Federal Department of Foreign Affairs,
Simonetta Sommaruga (SPS/PSS), from Bern, head of the Federal Department of Justice and Police,
Johann Schneider-Ammann (FDP.The Liberals), from Bern, head of the Federal Department of Economic Affairs, Education and Research,
Alain Berset (SPS/PSS), from Fribourg, head of the Federal Department of Home Affairs.

Results
Source showing only the final tallies in favour of the winner of each seat:

Seat held by Doris Leuthard 

Doris Leuthard (CVP/PDC) was reelected in the first round of voting.

Seat held by Ueli Maurer 

Ueli Maurer (SVP/UDC) was reelected in the first round of voting.

Seat held by Didier Burkhalter 

Didier Burkhalter (FDP.The Liberals) was reelected in the first round of voting.

Seat held by Simonetta Sommaruga 

Simonetta Sommaruga (SPS/PSS) was reelected in the first round of voting.

Seat held by Johann Schneider-Ammann 

Johann Schneider-Ammann (FDP.The Liberals) was reelected in the first round of voting.

Seat held by Alain Berset 

Alain Berset (SPS/PSS) was reelected in the first round of voting.

Vacant seat 

Guy Parmelin (SVP/UDC) was elected to the Federal Council after three rounds of voting.

References

Federal Council
2015
December 2015 events in Switzerland